Ukpe and Bayobiri form a Nigerian dialect cluster of the Bendi branch of the Benue–Congo languages.

References

Bendi languages
Languages of Nigeria